Chaudhry Ashfaq Ahmed is a Pakistani politician who was a Member of the Provincial Assembly of the Punjab, from May 2013 to May 2018.

Early life and education
He was born on 1 January 1967 in Layyah.

He has received matriculation education.

Political career
He was elected to the Provincial Assembly of the Punjab as an independent candidate from Constituency PP-266 (Layyah-V) in 2013 Pakistani general election. He joined Pakistan Muslim League (N) in May 2013.

References

Living people
Punjab MPAs 2013–2018
1967 births
Pakistan Muslim League (N) politicians